Calendula officinalis, the pot marigold, common marigold, ruddles, Mary's gold or Scotch marigold, is a flowering plant in the daisy family Asteraceae. It is probably native to southern Europe, though its long history of cultivation makes its precise origin unknown, and it may possibly be of garden origin. It is also widely naturalised farther north in Europe (as far as southern England) and elsewhere in warm temperate regions of the world.

The Latin specific epithet officinalis refers to the plant's medicinal and herbal uses.

Description
The inflorescences are yellow, comprising a thick capitulum or flowerhead  diameter surrounded by two rows of hairy bracts; in the wild plant they have a single ring of ray florets surrounding the central disc florets. The disc florets are tubular and hermaphrodite, and generally of a more intense orange-yellow colour than the female, tridentate, peripheral ray florets. The flowers may appear all year long where conditions are suitable. The fruit is a thorny curved achene and weight in average 10.1 mg (n=50).

Calendulas are used as food plants by the larvae of some Lepidoptera species including cabbage moth, gothic moth, large yellow underwing, and setaceous Hebrew character.

Cultivation

Calendula officinalis is widely cultivated and can be grown easily in sunny locations in most kinds of soils. Although perennial, it is commonly treated as an annual, particularly in colder regions where its winter survival is poor, and in hot summer locations where it also does not survive.

Calendulas are considered by many gardening experts as among the easiest and most versatile flowers to grow in a garden, especially because they tolerate most soils. In temperate climates, seeds are sown in spring for blooms that last throughout the summer and well into the fall. In areas of limited winter freezing, seeds are sown in autumn for winter color. Plants will wither in subtropical summer. Seeds will germinate freely in sunny or half-sunny locations, but plants do best if planted in sunny locations with rich, well-drained soil. Pot marigolds typically bloom quickly from seed (in under two months) in bright yellows, golds, and oranges.

Most cultivars have a spicy aroma. It is recommended to deadhead (remove dying flower heads) the plants regularly to maintain even blossom production.

Cultivars
Numerous cultivars have been selected for variation in the flowers, from pale yellow to orange-red, and with 'double' or 'semi-double' flowerheads with ray florets replacing some or all of the disc florets. Examples include 'Alpha' (deep orange), 'Jane Harmony', 'Sun Glow' (bright yellow), 'Lemon' (pale yellow), 'Orange Prince' (orange), 'Indian Prince' (dark orange-red), 'Pink Surprise' (double, with inner florets darker than outer florets), 'Green-heart Gold' (double, bright yellow), 'Apricot Pygmy' (double light peach) and 'Chrysantha' (yellow, double). 'Variegata' is a cultivar with yellow variegated leaves.

The cultivar group 'Fiesta Gitana' has gained the Royal Horticultural Society's Award of Garden Merit.

Uses
Pot marigold florets are edible. They are often used to add color to salads or added to dishes as a garnish and in lieu of saffron. The leaves are edible but are often not palatable. They have a history of use as a potherb and in salads. The plant is also used to make tea.

Flowers were used in ancient Greek, Roman, Middle Eastern, and Indian cultures as a medicinal herb, as well as a dye for fabrics, foods, and cosmetics. Many of these uses persist today. They are also used to make oil that protects the skin.

Marigold leaves can also be made into a poultice that is believed to help scratches and shallow cuts to heal faster, and to help prevent infection. It has also been used in eye drops.

Constituents
The petals and pollen of Calendula officinalis contain triterpenoid esters and the carotenoids flavoxanthin and auroxanthin (antioxidants and the source of the yellow-orange coloration). The leaves and stems contain other carotenoids, mostly lutein (80%), zeaxanthin (5%), and beta-carotene. Plant extracts are also widely used by cosmetics, presumably due to presence of compounds such as saponins, resins, and essential oils.

The flowers of Calendula officinalis contain flavonol glycosides, triterpene oligoglycosides, oleanane-type triterpene glycosides, saponins, and a sesquiterpene glucoside.
Calendula flowers are a rich source of lutein, containing 29.8 mg/100g.

Potential pharmacology
Plant pharmacological studies have suggested that Calendula extracts may have anti-viral, anti-genotoxic, and anti-inflammatory properties in vitro. In an in vitro assay, the methanol extract of C. officinalis exhibited antibacterial activity and both the methanol and the ethanol extracts showed antifungal activities.

References

Further reading

External links

officinalis
Flora of Europe
Garden plants of Europe
Inflorescence vegetables
Leaf vegetables
Medicinal plants of Europe
Plants described in 1753
Taxa named by Carl Linnaeus
Plant dyes